Gordon Benedict John McGurk (born 5 September 1965) is a Scottish lawyer and former cricketer.

One of ten children of Dr Francis Myrle McGurk, and his wife Josephine, McGurk was born at Edinburgh in September 1965. A club cricketer for Uddingston Cricket Club, McGurk made his debut for Scotland in a List A one-day match against Warwickshire at Edgbaston in the 1988 NatWest Trophy. He was a regular in the Scottish eleven in one-day cricket in 1988 and 1989 in both the Benson & Hedges Cup and the NatWest Trophy, but did not feature for Scotland in one-day cricket between 1989 and 1994. He returned to Scottish one-day side in 1994 and 1995 in matches in the Benson & Hedges Cup and the NatWest Trophy. In 12 one-day matches for Scotland, he scored 190 runs at an average of 17.27, with a highest score of 37. In addition to playing one-day cricket for Scotland, McGurk also made two appearances in first-class cricket against Ireland in 1988 and 1994, making a half century in the 1988 match.

McGurk gained a PhD in genetics from the University of Edinburgh and later emigrated to Australia, where he gained the degree of Juris Doctor from Southern Cross University. He is a lawyer in the Supreme Court of Queensland, specialising in clinical trials and research integrity. He is chairperson of the Royal Brisbane and Women's Hospital Human Research Ethics Committee.

References

External links
 

1965 births
Living people
Cricketers from Edinburgh
Scottish cricketers
Alumni of the University of Edinburgh
Scottish emigrants to Australia
Southern Cross University alumni
Scottish lawyers